Hillside Park High School, also known as Hillside High School, James A. Whitted Elementary School, and James A. Whitted Junior
High School, is a historic school building for African-American students located at Durham, Durham County, North Carolina. The original Classical Revival portion dates to 1922 and is a T-shaped, two-story building on a full basement. A three-story red-brick, T-shaped Modern Movement style addition was built in 1954–1955, with a one-story-on-basement gymnasium rear wing.  Also on the property is a contributing greenhouse built about 1960. The school served the African-American student population of Durham until 1970, when the schools were integrated.

It was listed on the National Register of Historic Places in 2013.

References

High schools in North Carolina
African-American history in Durham, North Carolina
School buildings on the National Register of Historic Places in North Carolina
Neoclassical architecture in North Carolina
Modern Movement architecture in the United States
School buildings completed in 1922
Buildings and structures in Durham, North Carolina
National Register of Historic Places in Durham County, North Carolina
1922 establishments in North Carolina